Locked Down is a 2021 American romantic comedy heist film directed by Doug Liman and written by Steven Knight. The film stars Anne Hathaway and Chiwetel Ejiofor, with Stephen Merchant, Mindy Kaling, Lucy Boynton, Mark Gatiss, Claes Bang, Ben Stiller, and Ben Kingsley in supporting roles.

Locked Down follows a couple who plan to execute a heist of a jewelry store. It was written, financed, and filmed entirely during the COVID-19 pandemic. The film was released in the United States on January 14, 2021, on HBO Max, and received mixed reviews from critics.

The film was removed from HBO Max in August 2022.

Plot
Paxton and Linda are a disgruntled couple living in London during the COVID-19 pandemic lockdown. Paxton is able to get only jobs as a delivery truck driver due to an assault arrest 10 years prior and is upset about how his life has turned out.

Due to stores being shut down there are a limited amount of drivers available for high-value deliveries, so Paxton’s boss asks him to make runs under a false identity for him. Linda, who is a CEO at a marketing company, is tasked with clearing out inventory from a fashion display she planned at the nearby Harrods department store. She soon realizes their delivery schedules at the store overlap, and Paxton would not get past the security checkpoint Linda has set up.

Linda discloses that there is a £3 million diamond in the vault at Harrods that has been sold to an anonymous buyer, and the store keeps a duplicate on location. She and Paxton agree to take the real diamond for themselves and send the fake one to the buyer in New York City, splitting the sale between themselves and the National Health Service.

Upon making it to the store, Linda and Paxton retrieve the diamond and swap it out with the fake. However, they are confronted by Donald, a former co-worker of Linda's she was told to fire earlier in the week. Donald had called the police after learning of Paxton's fake identity. Linda reveals their plan, and Donald agrees to lie for them.

Paxton and Linda, who originally planned to go their separate ways, decide to reevaluate their relationship. Then the COVID lockdown is extended by another two weeks.

Cast

 Anne Hathaway as Linda, Paxton's separated partner
 Chiwetel Ejiofor as Paxton, Linda's separated partner
 Stephen Merchant as Michael Morgan, Head of Security at Harrods
 Mindy Kaling as Kate, Linda's former co-worker at Harrods
 Lucy Boynton as Charlotte
 Mark Gatiss as Donald, Linda's co-worker
 Claes Bang as Essien, the owner of Linda's company
 Dulé Hill as David, Paxton's half-brother
 Jazmyn Simon as Maria, David's wife
 Sam Spruell as Martin, Paxton's co-worker
 Frances Ruffelle as Paxton and Linda's neighbor
 Ben Stiller as Guy, Linda's boss
 Ben Kingsley as Malcolm, Paxton's boss

Production
The film was announced in September 2020 as Lockdown, with Doug Liman directing a screenplay that Steven Knight had written that July over a dare. Anne Hathaway was announced to star, with filming set to start later that month in London. Chiwetel Ejiofor, Ben Stiller, Lily James, Stephen Merchant, Dulé Hill, Jazmyn Simon, and Mark Gatiss were also announced as cast members. In October 2020, Mindy Kaling, Ben Kingsley, and Lucy Boynton were added to the cast of the film, with Boynton replacing James. Claes Bang, Sam Spruell and Frances Ruffelle were revealed as members of the cast in January 2021.

The film was shot over the course of 18 days. Due to the limited resources and short production window the order of several scenes needed to be adjusted, forcing Hathaway and Ejiofor to tape their un-memorized lines around set. Despite initial reports it had a budget of $10 million, Liman insisted the actual cost of the film "started with a three." The UK-based company Koala FX was responsible for the advance clean up.

John Powell scored the film making it the first time he worked with Doug Liman since Fair Game in 2010.

Release
The film was quickly acquired by HBO Max in December 2020, with the intention for an early 2021 release. It was released on January 14, 2021.

Reception
On review aggregator website Rotten Tomatoes, Locked Down holds an approval rating of 42% based on 115 reviews, with an average of 5.00/10. The website's critics consensus states, "Locked Down combines a heist caper, a relationship drama, and pandemic-era timeliness to produce a film that's frustratingly less than the sum of its parts." According to Metacritic, which sampled 33 mainstream critics and calculated a weighted average score of 42 out of 100, the film received "mixed or average reviews".

David Ehrlich of IndieWire gave the film a B and wrote: "Yes, Locked Down is a heist movie, though one that's more concerned with 'stealing back the things that you feel life owes you than it is with priceless jewels... COVID-19 serves as a fitting backdrop for an amiable romp about the freedoms we take for granted, and the confines that dictated our lives long before we were forced to spend them at home." Nick Allen of RogerEbert.com gave the film 2 out of 4 stars, writing that "in spite of the available chemistry and charisma from Hathaway and Ejiofor, Locked Down proves to be a bewildering mess." Erik Nielsen of Little White Lies criticised the film and wrote: "a tone-deaf pandemic crime caper" and "affluent couple plot an audacious diamond heist in the Covid movie absolutely no one needed" scoring the film with a 1/5 rating.

References

External links
 
 
 
 

2021 films
2021 crime films
2021 romantic comedy films
2020s crime comedy films
2020s English-language films
2020s heist films
American crime comedy films
American heist films
American romantic comedy films
Films about the COVID-19 pandemic
Films directed by Doug Liman
Films scored by John Powell
Films set in 2020
Films set in London
Films shot in London
Films with screenplays by Steven Knight
Harrods
HBO Max films
Media depictions of the COVID-19 pandemic in the United Kingdom
Romantic crime films
Warner Bros. films
2020s American films